Despotis is a village of the Grevena municipality. Before the 1997 local government reform it was a part of the community of Agioi Theodoroi. The 2011 census recorded 15 residents in the village.

See also
 List of settlements in the Grevena regional unit

References

Populated places in Grevena (regional unit)